Common bond may refer to:

 Common bond of association among members of credit unions and cooperative banks
 Common bond (bricklaying), a kind of bond in bricklaying
 Common Bond (magazine), a journal on the maintenance of religious buildings published by the New York Landmarks Conservancy
 CommonBond, a crowdsourced, peer-to-peer loan platform for American university students
 Human bonding, the process of development of a close, interpersonal relationship between two or more people